Luke's Shattered Sleep is a 1916 American short comedy film starring Harold Lloyd.

Cast
 Harold Lloyd as Lonesome Luke
 Bebe Daniels
 Snub Pollard
 Charles Stevenson (as Charles E. Stevenson)
 Billy Fay
 Fred C. Newmeyer
 Sammy Brooks
 Bud Jamison
 Earl Mohan
 Vesta Marlowe
 Sidney De Gray
 Ray Thompson
 Norman Napier (as Norman DePure)
 Minnie Eckhardt (as Minnie Eckert)
 Lillian Avery
 Maybelle Beringer (as Maybelle Buringer)
 Gusta Berg
 Beth Darwin
 Villatta Singley
 Lola Walker
 Hilda Limbeck
 Annette Hatten
 Frances Scott
 Gus Leonard
 Harry Todd
 Margaret Joslin (as Mrs. Harry Todd)

See also
 Harold Lloyd filmography

References

External links

1916 films
1916 short films
American silent short films
American black-and-white films
Films directed by Hal Roach
Lonesome Luke films
1916 comedy films
Silent American comedy films
American comedy short films
1910s American films